History of the World is a 1997 computer board game developed by Colorado Computer Creations and published by Eidos Interactive.

Setting
It is an adaptation of Avalon Hill's History of the World board game.

Reception

History of the World was a commercial failure, with fewer than 10,000 copies sold by November 1998. This contributed to the sale and closure of Avalon Hill that year.

In Computer Gaming World, Bob Proctor wrote, "History of the World is both a good game and a disappointment." He praised its accurate reproduction of the original board game, but heavily criticized its multiplayer features, and called its lack of online play "inexcusable" for a multiplayer title in 1997. Conversely, Scott Udell of Computer Games Strategy Plus called it "a very solid game; for multiplayer it's excellent, and even for solo players it provides a mostly satisfying (and fast — usually under an hour) gaming experience." He particularly praised its play-by-email feature. However, Udell noted bugs within History of the World, and felt that the game's video sequences "range from weak to painful".

In a negative review, PC Gamer USs William R. Trotter wrote that History of the World "looks and feels dated", and that it "quickly becomes boring." He believed that the charm of the board game had been lost in translation, and called its full motion video "the ugliest I've ever seen." Trotter summarized, "It gives die-hard fans a chance to play online, and that's the only reason I can think of for buying it."

References

External links
Mobygames entry

1997 video games
Video games based on board games
Video games developed in the United States
Windows games
Windows-only games